Simaluguri (IPA: ˌʃɪmɑːlʊˈgʊərɪ or ˌsɪmɑːlʊˈgʊərɪ) is a town area in Sivasagar district in the state of Assam, India.The Dikhow River flows near it.

Transportation
The primary railway station of Sivasagar district is Simaluguri Junction railway station, which lies on the Lumding–Dibrugarh section.

References 

Cities and towns in Sivasagar district